Taehwasan (Gyeonggi-do) is a mountain of South Korea. It has an elevation of 641 metres

See also
List of mountains of Korea

References

Mountains of Gyeonggi Province
Gwangju, Gyeonggi
Mountains of South Korea